Mondi sommersi is the seventh studio album from Italian rock band Litfiba. It is the fourth chapter of the "Tetralogy of elements". It is dedicated to water.

Track listing
"Ritmo" – 4:13
"Imparerò"  – 3:27
"Regina di Cuori"  – 4:05
"Goccia a goccia"  – 4:42
"Si può" – 4:34
"Ritmo #2"  – 4:34
"L’esercito delle forchette" – 5:12
"Sparami" – 4:38
"Apri le tue porte" – 4:12
"Dottor M" – 5:05
"In fondo alla boccia" – 3:43

Personnel
Piero Pelù – vocals
Daniele Bagni – bass
Ghigo Renzulli – guitars
Franco Caforio – drums
Candelo Cabezas – percussions
Roberto Terzani – programming

Produced by Ghigo Renzulli, Piero Pelù, Richard Guy

External links

Litfiba albums
1997 albums
EMI Records albums
Italian-language albums